The Battle of Đồng Xoài was a major battle fought during the Vietnam War as part of the Viet Cong (VC) Summer Offensive of 1965. It took place in Phước Long Province, South Vietnam, between June 9 and 13, 1965.

In 1964, South Vietnamese General Nguyễn Khánh had overthrown General Dương Văn Minh in a military coup. Khánh took control of the South Vietnamese government and its military junta, but he implemented laws that limited the freedoms of the civilian population, and this alienated the South Vietnamese people. After a falling-out with the Catholic faction within his own government, Khánh became increasingly reliant on the Buddhist movement in order to retain control. Consequently, on February 20, 1965, Khánh was ousted and was forced to emigrate.

The political instability in Saigon gave North Vietnamese leaders an opportunity to step up their military campaign in the south. They believed that the South Vietnamese government's power relied on the country's strong military, so the North Vietnamese People's Army of Vietnam (PAVN) and VC launched the Summer Offensive of 1965 to inflict significant losses on South Vietnamese forces. In Phước Long Province, the PAVN/VC summer offensive culminated in the Đồng Xoài campaign.

The fight for Đồng Xoài began on the evening of June 9, 1965, when the VC 272nd Regiment attacked and captured the Civilian Irregular Defense Group and U.S. Special Forces camp there. The Army of the Republic of Vietnam (ARVN) Joint General Staff responded to the sudden assault by ordering the ARVN 1st Battalion, 7th Infantry Regiment, 5th ARVN Infantry Division to retake the district of Đồng Xoài. The ARVN forces arrived on the battlefield on June 10, but in the vicinity of Thuận Lợi, the VC 271st Regiment overwhelmed the South Vietnamese battalion. Later that day, the ARVN 52nd Ranger Battalion, which had survived an ambush while marching towards Đồng Xoài, recaptured the district. On June 11, the ARVN 7th Airborne Battalion arrived to reinforce the South Vietnamese position; as the paratroopers were searching the Thuận Lợi rubber plantation for survivors from the 1st Battalion, the VC caught them in a deadly ambush.

On June 13, U.S. Army General William Westmoreland, fearing that the VC might secure enough area to establish a large base in Phước Long Province, decided to insert elements of the U.S. 173rd Airborne Brigade into a major battle for the first time. By then, however, the VC had already withdrawn from the battlefield, and the U.S. paratroopers were ordered to return to base without having engaged with the North Vietnamese.

Background 
In January 1964, General Khánh ousted General Dương Văn Minh as the leader of South Vietnam's military junta in a bloodless coup. Although Khánh had made considerable efforts to consolidate his power, opposition to his rule began to grow as he tightened censorship laws, banned protests and allowed police arbitrary search and imprisonment powers. Khánh drafted a new constitution, which would have expanded his power within the military junta. In response to Khánh's political manoeuvres the South Vietnamese people, predominately Buddhists, held large demonstrations in the cities calling for an end to the draconian laws which had limited the people’s political freedom. Fearing that his power could be weakened by those demonstrations, Khánh immediately repealed his constitution and new police powers. He promised to reinstate civilian rule and remove members of the Catholic-based Cần lao from power.

Internally, the concessions made by Khánh had the effect of unsettling Catholic officers such as Nguyễn Văn Thiệu and Trần Thiện Khiêm, because they were concerned by what they perceived to be the handing of power to Buddhist leaders. Subsequently, Khiêm fell out with Khánh over policy issues along religious lines, even though an alliance between both men had enabled Khánh to remove Minh from power. As military support for his regime diminished, Khánh had to rely upon civilian Buddhist activists to maintain power. For the Americans, Khánh's increased reliance on the Buddhists was a cause for concern, because the Buddhists favoured a political resolution to the conflict with the Communists. Thus, by the end of 1964 the Americans looked for someone to overthrow Khánh, in order to continue the military effort against the Communists. On February 20, 1965, Khánh was finally removed from power, and he was forced to leave South Vietnam.

From the Communist perspective, even though South Vietnam was plagued by political instability, it still had a strong army to resist the VC. So shortly after the Binh Gia campaign, North Vietnamese leaders reached a resolution to launch a summer offensive, to destroy the regular units of the South Vietnamese military. During the early stages of the Communist summer campaign, VC forces in Quảng Ngãi Province successfully destroyed a South Vietnamese task force, led by the ARVN 51st Infantry Regiment, in the village of Ba Gia. Following their victory at Ba Gia, the VC turned its attention to the Mekong Delta region. To prepare for their next offensive, Major-General Le Trong Tan was given the task of directing VC military operations in the provinces of Phước Long, Bình Phước. For the first time, the newly created VC 273rd and 274th Regiments was ordered to join the 271st and 272nd Regiments on the battlefield; their objective was to destroy the regular units of the South Vietnamese military and eliminate the strategic hamlets to enlarge what North Vietnam viewed as 'liberated zones'.

Prelude 
Since May 1965, the VC offensive in Phước Long Province had been in full-swing. Beginning on May 10, the VC 271st Regiment, supported by the 840th Battalion and local sapper units, attacked the district town of Phước Long, capital of the province. Simultaneously, the VC 272nd Regiment overran South Vietnamese government positions in the sub-sector of Phước Bình. During their brief occupation of Phước Long district, the VC destroyed several major strategic hamlets in the surrounding areas, such as Ba Ra, Thuan Kiem, Thuan Loi, Phu Rieng, Da Kia, Bu Dop, Duc Bon and Song Be.

In response to the VC occupation of Phước Long district, the ARVN 36th Ranger Battalion was ordered by the ARVN Joint General Staff to recapture government positions there. On May 11, two companies from the battalion sustained heavy casualties in battles with VC units positioned along Inter-Provincial Road 13 and National Highway 14. On May 12, the Viet Cong 271st Regiment and other support units withdrew from Phuoc Long district.

In the Phước Bình sub-sector, the VC 272nd Regiment were able to overrun South Vietnamese government positions within 25 minutes, and they claimed to have killed 115 South Vietnamese soldiers in the process. At 9 am on May 11, the ARVN 34th Ranger Battalion was airlifted into a small town located about 14 kilometres away from Phước Bình in the south-east. As the ARVN 34th Ranger Battalion marched upward towards Phước Bình, the VC 272nd and 273rd Regiment was ordered to destroy the Rangers. However, by the time the 272nd Regiment arrived at the South Vietnamese staging area, the Rangers had already pulled out and successfully recaptured Phước Bình. Meanwhile, on May 15, the VC 274th Regiment defeated two South Vietnamese Regional Force companies along Route 20 and destroyed 20 vehicles in the process.

After those operations in Phước Long district and Phước Bình sub-sector, the VC 9th Division was ordered to attack Đồng Xoài. In 1965, Đồng Xoài was a district town situated at a road junction which connected Inter-Provisional Road 13, National Highway 1 and Highway 14. The district was defended by 200 local Vietnamese soldiers drawn from the 327th and 328th Militia Companies, and the 111th Regional Force Company. They were supported by one armoured squadron (6 armoured vehicles) and two 105mm howitzers. There were also 200 Cambodian soldiers of a Civilian Irregular Defense Group, 11 United States Army Special Forces personnel and nine men of Seabee Team 1104. Prior to the battle, the U.S Special Forces had assumed control of Đồng Xoài's defences; they stepped up guard and patrol activities, and ordered the construction of new defensive fortifications around the district headquarters, the Special Forces Camp and the armoured and artillery positions on the eastern side of the district.

Battle 

On the evening of June 9, 1965, the VC made final preparations for their assault on Đồng Xoài. While the VC assembled their formations, U.S.-led forces inside the Special Forces Camp were suddenly placed on alert, forcing the VC to commence their attack 70 minutes earlier than scheduled. At 11:30 pm, VC heavy mortar rounds began to fall on South Vietnamese and American positions around Đồng Xoài, soon followed by an infantry assault led by the 272nd Regiment. During the initial assault, the VC sustained heavy casualties as they tried to navigate through the surrounding minefields and barb wire fences, which they had failed to pick up during previous reconnaissance missions. At about 1:30 am, two helicopter gunships from the U.S. Army's 118th Aviation Company were dispatched to support the Special Forces Camp, they fired on the VC around the compound, and returned to base only after their weapons load was emptied. At around 2:30 am, the Americans and a few of the Cambodian soldiers retreated to the district headquarters, where other local troops were holding out. Meanwhile, at Biên Hòa Air Base, all flight crews of the 118th Aviation Company were on the flightline preparing for combat assault at first light. By that time, however, the VC had captured the Special Forces compound, and they began massing for an attack on the district headquarters.

While fighting raged inside the district, all flyable aircraft from the 118th Aviation Company flew out from Biên Hòa to Phước Vinh, a small town about 30 kilometres from Đồng Xoài. From Phước Vinh the first contingent of the ARVN 1st Battalion, 7th Infantry Regiment, was airlifted into the battlefield. At around 8 am, the UH-1 formations of the 118th Aviation Company descend on the landing zone near the Thuận Lợi rubber plantation, about 4 kilometres north of Đồng Xoài; they immediately began to receive fire from bunkers and foxholes surrounding the area. The South Vietnamese command believed the landing zone near Thuận Lợi would be ideal to land their troops, because it was distant enough that the VC would not find and engage them immediately. However, the VC had anticipated the South Vietnamese would land troops in the area, and had prepared for an ambush. As a result, after U.S. helicopters had departed from the landing zone, soldiers of the VC 271st Regiment immediately turned their attention on the South Vietnamese. Within 15 minutes the main body of the ARVN 1st Battalion was completely destroyed.

At around 11:55 am, the last remaining soldiers of the ARVN 1st Battalion were disembarked near the original landing zone in Thuận Lợi, and they too were put out of action within three minutes of touching down on the field. During the afternoon, the VC had managed to destroy parts of the district headquarters building using their 57mm recoilless rifle. Second Lieutenant Williams then ordered 14 Americans inside the building, along with an equal number of Vietnamese women and children, to retreat to the artillery position located east of the town where they continued their resistance. Late in the afternoon on June 10, the U.S. 118th Aviation Company was joined by other elements of the 145th Combat Aviation Battalion in their final sorties for the day; airlifting the ARVN 52nd Ranger Battalion from Phước Vinh into Đồng Xoài, with the objective of recapturing the road junction and the Special Forces Camp. Following their last mission, the 118th Aviation Company immediately returned to Biên Hòa. During the first day of heavy fighting, every helicopter in the unit had sustained damage, including the loss of one helicopter and its entire crew.

At 3:20 pm, the ARVN 52nd Ranger Battalion were discharged on a landing zone about 3 kilometres south of Đồng Xoài. As the Rangers marched towards the town centre, their lead company was decimated in an ambush mounted by elements of the VC 271st Regiment. Undeterred by the strength of the VC, they continued their march towards the district. On the night of June 10, the battalion began attacking VC positions around the Special Forces Camp, and they gradually recaptured the compound and much of the town. The VC eventually launched a counter-attack in an attempt to win back the lost ground, but they failed to dislodge the soldiers of the ARVN 52nd Ranger Battalion. The next morning, on June 11, the 118th Aviation Company was back at full strength in Phước Vinh. Like the previous day, they flew air-support and airlifted further reinforcements from the ARVN 7th Airborne Battalion. After the Airborne troopers were dropped off on a soccer field, the 118th Aviation Company started large-scale evacuation of South Vietnamese casualties. In contrast to the previous day, the 118th Aviation Company encountered only isolated rear guard actions.

Just before the ARVN 7th Airborne Battalion landed on the battlefield, the VC had intercepted a radio conversation between the aforementioned unit and the 52nd Ranger Battalion in the district centre; several months earlier the 7th Airborne Battalion was involved in the battle at Bình Giã, so they vowed to avenge the loss of their comrades. Thus, from the soccer field, the ARVN 7th Airborne Battalion marched up to Thuận Lợi, against only light opposition. The Airborne arrived at the area where the first group of the ARVN 1st Battalion, 7th Infantry Regiment, was dropped off and they collected seven survivors and 55 bodies. In the afternoon, as elements of the 7th Airborne Battalion moved through the Thuận Lợi rubber plantation to search for remnants of the second group of the ARVN 1st Battalion, the VC 271st Regiment started attacking the Airborne in a manner which had characterised earlier ambushes. Taking advantage of the poor weather conditions that had limited U.S. air strikes, as well as their numerical superiority, the VC broke the South Vietnamese formation into small groups and destroyed many of them. On the next day, the strength of the ARVN 7th Airborne Battalion was reduced from 470 to just 159 soldiers.

After the defeat of the ARVN 7th Airborne Battalion, U.S. General William Westmoreland concluded that the VC still had the strength to continue the attacks on Đồng Xoài. In contrast, South Vietnamese forces within the vicinity of Đồng Xoài were severely depleted, and did not have sufficient strength to defeat the VC. Furthermore, there was only one remaining battalion in South Vietnam’s strategic reserve, and it may not be enough to drive the VC out from the area if it was committed.

Westmoreland was unwilling to leave the VC with a position from which they could dominate Phước Long Province. So, on June 13, he made the decision to insert U.S. combat forces. Subsequently, 738 men of the 1st Battalion (Airborne), 503rd Infantry Regiment, 173rd Airborne Brigade, were flown out to the staging area in Phước Vinh. Elements of the 3rd Battalion (Airborne), 319th Artillery also followed later in the day. Upon arrival at Phước Vinh, the U.S. Army task force waited for five days, but it soon became apparent that the VC had withdrawn from the area and had no intention of holding territory. On June 18, the 1/503rd Infantry was ordered to return to base.

Aftermath 
In this battle both sides of the conflict had paid a heavy price to achieve their objectives. After the battle, search parties found several hundred VC bodies within small arms range of the Special Forces compound and district headquarters, and another 126 VC bodies inside these compounds. Numerous other VC casualties had been evacuated or incurred in the fighting beyond the town's borders. In their efforts to recapture the district town of Đồng Xoài, the South Vietnamese military lost 416 soldiers killed in action, 174 wounded and 233 missing. In addition, over one hundred South Vietnamese civilians were believed to have been massacred by the VC during their brief occupation of the area. Total casualties sustained by U.S. military personnel included 20 soldiers killed or wounded, and 13 missing. According to Vietnam's official account of the Đồng Xoài campaign, they claimed to have put 4,459 enemy soldiers (including 73 Americans) out of action. Furthermore, 1,652 weapons of various kinds were captured, 390 weapons and 60 vehicles were destroyed, 34 aircraft and 3 helicopters were shot down.

Even though the VC had won an apparent victory over the regular ARVN units, they suffered considerable casualties. VC soldiers usually sought to evacuate their dead and wounded comrades, but they struggled to evacuate their casualties as conditions on the main roads deteriorated during the rainy season. The Đồng Xoài campaign marked the rapid maturity of the VC 9th Division as a fighting force. For their efforts during the battle, the VC 272nd Regiment received the title of 'Đồng Xoài Regiment'.

Six days after large-scale fighting in Đồng Xoài had concluded there was another change of government in Saigon. South Vietnamese Air Marshal Nguyễn Cao Kỳ was appointed prime minister and executive chairman of the government by the military junta and General Nguyễn Văn Thiệu became a figurehead president. Unlike previous leaders, Kỳ and Thiệu were more interested in fighting the Communists, and they intended to stop the Buddhist factions from interfering with their decision-making processes. However, due to Kỳ's lack of experience in civil government, the Americans were not entirely pleased with the formation of a new government with him as the leader. In contrast, Thiệu's appointment to the office of president was considered to be a positive development by the American Embassy and military command, because he possessed the political skills required by Saigon’s political establishment. Nonetheless, Kỳ's ascension to the position of prime minister had effectively ended the cycle of military coups which had plagued Saigon since the downfall of Ngô Đình Diệm.

In a significant contrast to the political scene in South Vietnam, the North Vietnamese government were more occupied with their military effort. The North Vietnamese Transportation Group 559, then under the leadership of Major-General Phan Trong Tue, was ordered to open new transportation and communication lines through southern Laos and South Vietnam to facilitate the movement of troops and material through the Pathet Lao-occupied section of the Ho Chi Minh trail. They were supported by 1,500 workers from the Ministry of Transportation and 7,600 volunteers. By the end of 1965, the strength of Group 559 had grown to 24,400 personnel organised in six battalions of motor vehicles, one battalion of boats, 18 battalions of combat engineers, four battalions of anti-aircraft artillery and guard units. In addition to the expansion of their logistical abilities, the North Vietnamese also decided to establish five infantry divisions and one artillery in South Vietnam. Thus, the stage was set for a major military struggle with American and other allied forces.

See also 
 Charles Q. Williams, awarded the Medal of Honor for conduct during the battle.
 Marvin G. Shields, awarded the Medal of Honor for conduct during the battle.

Notes

References 
 Anonymous. (1965). The Song Be—Đồng Xoài Victory. Binh Thuan: Liberation Publishing House.
 Anonymous. (1988). The Great Anti-U.S. War of Resistance for National Salvation: Military Events. Hanoi: People's Army Publishing House.
 Ang Cheng Guan. (2002). The Vietnam War From the Other Side: The Vietnamese Communists’ Perspective. London: Routledge.
 George Kahin. (1986). A Death in November: America in Vietnam, 1963. New York: E.P.Dutton.
 John M. Carland. (2000). Stemming the Tide: May 1965 to October 1966. Washington: U.S. Government Printing Office.
 Mark Moyar. (2004). Political Monks: The Militant Buddhist Movement During the Vietnam War. New York: Cambridge University Press.
 Mark Moyar. (2006). Triumph Forsaken: The Vietnam War 1954–1975. New York: Cambridge University Press.
 Nguyen Dinh Uoc & Nguyen Van Minh. (1997). History of the War of Resistance Against America (3rd edn). Hanoi: National Politics Publishing.
 Robert Shaplen. (1966). The Lost Revolution: Vietnam 1945–1965. London: Andre Deutsch.
 People’s Liberation Armed Forces. (1967). History of 272nd Regiment, PLAF 9th Division. Binh Thuan: Giai Phong Publishing.

External links 
 Đồng Xoài: Seabees Earn a Special Place in Combat History
 The Battle of Đồng Xoài

Conflicts in 1965
1965 in Vietnam
History of Bình Phước Province
Battles and operations of the Vietnam War in 1965
Battles involving the United States
Battles involving Vietnam
June 1965 events in Asia